Nepeta teydea is a species of flowering plant in the family Lamiaceae, native to the Canary Islands. It was first described by Philip Barker-Webb and Sabin Berthelot.

References

teydea
Flora of the Canary Islands